Grefsen station is a railway station at Storo in Oslo, Norway on the Gjøvik Line. From the station there is also a short railway, the Alnabru–Grefsen Line, to Alna on the Hoved Line. The station is located 6.82 km from Oslo Central Station and is located between Tøyen and Nydalen at 109.2 metes above sea level. It was opened on 20 December 1900, two years before the railway to Gjøvik was finished.

The station is served by commuter and regional trains operated by Vy Gjøvikbanen. Along the line to the east runs the Ring 3 road, and across that there is a tram and bus stop. A bit further north of Grefsen Station there is a connection to the Oslo Metro, at Storo.

The station serves Nordre Åsen sports field.

Tram Service 
There is also a tram stop with the same name across Ring 3. It is the terminating stop of line 17 and 18. Trams change routes here, without requiring a balloon loop. Here, a tram coming in from Sinsenkrysset (on line 17) will terminate and then change to route 18 and continue straight to Storo. The tram stop is also right next to Grefsen Depot.

External links
 Entry  at Jernbaneverket 
 Entry at the Norwegian Railway Club 

Railway stations in Oslo
Railway stations on the Gjøvik Line
Oslo Tramway stations in Oslo
Railway stations opened in 1900
1900 establishments in Norway